Hewitola stempfferi is a butterfly in the family Lycaenidae. It is found in Gabon.

References

Butterflies described in 1962
Poritiinae